Yadanabon is a name of Mandalay, and may refer to:

 Mandalay, Myanmar
 Yadanabon F.C., a Myanmar National League football club based in Mandalay
 Yadanabon University, a public university in Amarapura, Mandalay
Yadanabon Market
Yadanabon Zoological Gardens
Yadanabon Cyber City
Yadanabon Bridge
Yadanabon Hall

People 
 Yadanabon I of Pagan, consort of King Sithu I of Burma (r. 1112–67) 
 Yadanabon II of Pagan, chief queen consort of King Narathihapate of Burma (r. 1256–62)
 Yadanabon of Pinya, Queen of Pinle and Pinya (r. 1300s–25)

Publications
 Mani Yadanabon, a 1781 court treatise on precedents
 The Yadanabon, a daily newspaper published in Mandalay
 Mandalay Gazette, a monthly journal published in Los Angeles, California

Other uses
 Ratana-pon, a Buddhist stupa in Mrauk-U, Rakhine State, Myanmar
Yadanabon (film), a 1953 Burmese black-and-white drama film
 Yadanarbon, a Burmese drama television series